Rick Chester Krajewski (born June 21, 1991) is an American politician who currently serves in the Pennsylvania House of Representatives representing the 188th legislative district. A member of the Democratic Party and the Democratic Socialists of America, Krajewski was first elected during the 2020 Pennsylvania House of Representatives election, when he primaried incumbent Democrat Jim Roebuck.

Krajewski graduated from the University of Pennsylvania with a degree in engineering in 2013. Prior to being elected to the state house he worked as a software developer, leaving that job in order to work full-time as an activist. Krajewski is active in the organization and field campaigning of the progressive activist group Reclaim Philadelphia.

See also
List of Democratic Socialists of America who have held office in the United States

References

1991 births
Living people
American software engineers
Democratic Socialists of America politicians from Pennsylvania
Democratic Party members of the Pennsylvania House of Representatives
Pennsylvania socialists